The NSU Sharks Women's Tennis team represents Nova Southeastern University in Davie, Florida, United States. They compete in the Sunshine State Conference.

History
The women's team started in the 2003–2004 academic year. In its fourth season it posted a 22–3 record, and played a total of nine division I teams and won every match. The team has not won a conference championship yet, but is still considered to be one of the best teams in the conference.  The women's tennis team finished the year ranked 8th nationally and 2nd regionally.

Season by season results

Tennis, Women